Albany County School District #1 is a public school district based in Laramie, Wyoming, United States.

Geography
Albany County School District #1 serves all of Albany County, including the following communities:

Incorporated places
City of Laramie
Town of Rock River
Unincorporated places
Bosler
PhinDeli
Garrett
Tie Siding
Census-designated places (Note: All census-designated places are unincorporated.)
Albany
Centennial
The Buttes
Woods Landing-Jelm

History
The district approved a Spanish immersion program in April 2016.

Schools

High schools
Grades 9-12
Laramie High School
Rock River High School
Whiting High School

Junior high schools
Grades 7-8
Rock River Junior High School
Laramie Middle School

Elementary/Middle Schools
Grades K-9
Snowy Range Academy
UW Laboratory School
Grades K-8
Cozy Hollow School
River Bridge School

Elementary schools
Grades K-6
Beitel Elementary School
Centennial Elementary School
Harmony Elementary School
Indian Paintbrush Elementary School
Spring Creek Elementary School
Grades PK-6
Rock River Elementary School
Slade Elementary School
Velma Linford Elementary School

Student demographics
The following figures are as of October 1, 2018.

Total District Enrollment: 4,009
Student enrollment by gender
Male: 2,083 (51.96%)
Female: 1,926 (48.04%)
Student enrollment by ethnicity
American Indian or Alaska Native: 42 (1.05%)
Asian: 84 (2.10%)
Black or African American: 65 (1.62%)
Hispanic or Latino: 695 (17.34%)
Native Hawaiian or Other Pacific Islander: 5 (0.12%)
Two or More Races: 164 (4.12%)
White: 2,953 (73.66%)

Board of Education 
The Albany County School District #1 Board of Education is composed of nine members elected to rotating four year terms. As of June 2020, the current board if governed by:

See also
List of school districts in Wyoming

References

External links
Albany County School District #1 – official site.

Education in Albany County, Wyoming
School districts in Wyoming